Filamana is a village and seat of the commune of Koussan in the Cercle of Yanfolila in the Sikasso Region of southern Mali. The village lies 79 km south-southeast of Yanfolila.

References

Populated places in Sikasso Region